Hämeenmäki is a village in Hirvensalmi, Eastern Finland. It is located on the neck of land between the lakes Suontee and Vahvajärvi. Most notable landmark is Herranmäki, the 543 feet high hill where once stood a wooden triangulation tower. Now the hilltop grows lodgepole pine, but the pretty views above the village can still be seen from a cliff a little bit west from the top. In the village is also the old store, which has closed down. The nearest store is now in the neighbour village Tuukkala. Hämeenmäki has a nice swimming beach, Palmuranta, 2,5 km west at lake Suontee.

Villages in Finland